The Cadillac DPi-V.R is a sports prototype racing car which started competing in the IMSA WeatherTech SportsCar Championship in North America in 2017. It is the manufacturer variation of Dallara P217 base, and replaces the Corvette DP. It marked Cadillac's return to sports car racing as a full constructor for the first time since the Cadillac Northstar LMP that competed in American Le Mans Series from 2000 to 2002. It was unveiled on November 30, 2016.

Design
A closed-top design, it incorporates several new mechanical and safety features not used in the previous Corvette DP car. Zylon anti-intrusion panels are built into the frame that prevent any mechanical components from coming into the chassis in the event of an accident. The Cadillac DPi-V.R. has an electrical power steering system and an improved gearbox.

Results
The car's first win came at the 2017 24 Hours of Daytona by Wayne Taylor Racing. Action Express Racing won the 2018 edition with the car. Wayne Taylor Racing won again at the 2019 and 2020 editions of the race with the DPi-V.R.

Complete IMSA SportsCar Championship results 
Results in bold indicate pole position. Results in italics indicate fastest lap.

References

External links
Cadillac Racing Official Website
The Official Website of Cadillac

DPi
Dallara racing cars
Sports prototypes
Cars introduced in 2017